Pindus Mons is a mountain on the planet Mars which is located in Tempe Terra. The name was approved in 1991.

See also
 List of mountains on Mars

References

External links 
 Gazetteer of Planetary Nomenclature

Mountains on Mars
Arcadia quadrangle